Jessica McHugh is an American author of speculative fiction, member of the Maryland Writers Association, and an affiliate member of the Horror Writers Association. A prolific writer, she has had eighteen books published by small presses in seven years. Her first play "Fool call it Fate: a story of sex, coincidence, and an electronic cigarette", produced at  The Mobtown Theater, was chosen as the Best New Play of 2011 by Baltimore Broadway World.

Bibliography

Novels
 Camelot Lost (2008) (as Jessica Bonito) List of books about King Arthur#21st century
 A Touch of Scarlet (2009)
 Song of Eidolons (2009)
 From the Herald's Wearied Eye (2010)
 The Sky: The World (2010)
 Tales of Dominhydor
 Maladrid (Book One) (2010)
 Yven (Book Two) (2011)
 Palaplia (Book Three) (2011)
 Rabbits in the Garden (2011)
 Danny Marble & the Application for Non-Scary Things (2011)
 Play the Way Home (2012) (as E.J. McCain)
 PINS (2012)
 The Maiden Voyage (2014)
 The Darla Decker Diaries
 Darla Decker Hates to Wait (2014)
 Darla Decker Takes the Cake (2014)
 Darla Decker Shakes the State (2015)
 Darla Decker Plays it Straight (2016)
 Darla Decker Breaks the Case (2017)
 The Green Kangaroos (2014)
 The Train Derails in Boston (2016)
 Nightly Owl, Fatal Raven (2018)

Short stories
 "Begging for Relief" (2010)
"Under the Slide" (2010)
"Gather Ye Rosebuds" (2010)
"My Caroline, My Love" (2010)
"The Last Circus" (2011)
"Resuscitation" (2011)
"Maternal Instincts" (in "It Lives: What Hath Mother Wrought?" Anthology from Runewright Publishing, 2011)
"Master Marvel's Menagerie" (in "Dead Souls" Anthology from Post Mortem Press, 2011)
"Beer-Basted" (in "100 Horrors" Anthology from Cruentus Libri Press, 2012)
"A Ride in the Dream Machine" (in "Torn Realities" Anthology from Post Mortem Press, 2012)
"Extraction" (in "Fear the Abyss" Anthology from Post Mortem Press, 2012)
 "Crazed in Christmas City" (in "Let It Snow: Season's Readings for a Super Cool Yule" Anthology, 2012)
 "Love Aground" (in "Zombies Need Love, Too" Anthology from Dark Moon Books, 2013)
 "Mowed" (in "Dark Bits" Anthology from Apokrupha, 2013)
 "Auntie Grave" (in "The Gothic Blue Book III, Graveyard Edition" Anthology from Burial Day Books, 2013)
 "The Brain Train" (in "Coffin Hop: Death By Drive-In" Anthology, 2013)
 "On the Shoulders of Muses" (in "Allegories of the Tarot" Anthology, 2013)
 "Food For Thought" (One Night Stand, Perpetual Motion Machine Publishing, 2013)
 "The Right Stuff" (in  "Tall Tales with Short Cocks volume 4" Anthology from Rooster Republic Press, 2013)
 "A Fate My Lover Feared" (in  "Fur and Fang" Anthology from Apokrupha LLC, 2014)
 "The Riddled Heart" (in "Lucky 13" Anthology from Padwolf Publishing, 2014)
 "A Ribbon, A Rover" (in "Truth or Dare" Anthology from Perpetual Motion Machine Publishing, 2014)
 "Another Pleasant Valley Sunday" (in Jamais Vu: The Journal of Strange Among the Familiar, 2014)
 "Domestic Hate" (in "Potatoes" Anthology from Fringeworks LLC, 2014)
 "Blue Moon Over Gigi" (in "Vignettes from the End of the World" Anthology from Apokrupha, 2014)

Plays
 
 "Fools Call It Fate" (Lazy Bee Scripts, 2010)
 "Two Grunts For Yes" (Lazy Bee Scripts, 2017)

Collections
 Virtuoso at Masturbation, and More McHughmorous Musings (2013)
 The Maiden Voyage & Other Departures (2018)
 A Complex Accident of Life (2020)

References

External links 
 Official Website
 Obeying the Pen, Frederick News Post

1982 births
Living people
21st-century American novelists
American science fiction writers
American women short story writers
American women novelists
Women science fiction and fantasy writers
21st-century American women writers
21st-century American short story writers